Francisco de Paula Enrique de Borbón y Escasany, 5th Duke of Seville, Grandee of Spain (born 16 November 1943), is the current Duke of Seville and a distant relative of the Spanish royal family. He is a businessman and has been involved in banking, real estate and other commercial activities. He is not a Carlist pretender because of morganatic ancestry.

Early life
He was born in Madrid as the eldest child of Francisco de Borbón y Borbón (1912–1995), who was the younger son of Francisco de Borbón y de la Torre and Enriqueta de Borbón y Parade, 4th Duchess of Seville. His mother was Enriqueta Escasany y Miquel (1925–1962), daughter of Ignacio Escasany y Ancell and Enriqueta de Miquel y Mas, 2nd .

His paternal grandparents were first cousins, both being grandchildren of Infante Enrique of Spain. The Duke of Seville is a member of the Spanish branch of the House of Bourbon and is a relative of King Felipe VI of Spain, since both of them are male-line descendants of King Charles IV of Spain.

Duke of Seville
After the death of his grandmother, Enriqueta de Borbón y Parade, he inherited the title of Duke of Seville. His father had renounced his own rights to succeed to the title in 1968.

Marriages and children
He was married on 7 July 1973 at Baden-Baden to Countess Beatrice Wilhelmine Paula von Hardenberg (28 June 1947 in Donaueschingen – 14 March 2020 in Marbella), daughter of Count Günther von Hardenberg  and his wife, Princess Maria Josepha of Fürstenberg (granddaughter of Maximilian Egon II, Prince of Fürstenberg). The couple had three children and divorced on 30 June 1989 in Madrid.

They had two daughters and one son:
 Olivia Enriqueta María Josefa de Borbón y Hardenberg (born 6 April 1974 in London), entrepreneur and PR for jewelry brands; married to Julián Porras-Figueroa y Toledano (born 1982), with two children.
 Cristina Elena de Borbón y Hardenberg (2 September 1975 in Madrid – 13 February 2020 in Madrid), chef and catering service operator.
  (born 21 January 1979 in Madrid), entrepreneur and also appeared on the first season of TLC's reality television series, Secret Princes. In 2018, he was elected as 50th Grand Master of the Order of Saint Lazarus (Malta-Paris obedience). On 9 October 2021, he married Sophie Elizabeth Karoly, with whom he has a son, Francisco Máximo de Borbón y Karoly (born 2017).

He married for the second time on 19 October 1991 at Vienna to Isabelle Eugénie Karanitsch (born 23 November 1959 in Vienna), daughter of Franz M. Karanitsch and Tatjana Cimlov Karacevcev. They had no children and divorced on 17 June 1993 in Madrid.

He married for the third time on 2 September 2000 at Marbella to María de los Ángeles de Vargas-Zúñiga y Juanes (born 19 November 1954), daughter of Manuel de Vargas-Zúñiga y la Calzada and María de los Ángeles de Juanes y Lago. They have no children together.

The Order of Saint Lazarus

The Duke of Seville was elected as 48th Grand Master of the Order of Saint Lazarus (Malta obedience) on 5 October 1996 at Santa Maria della Passione in Milan, Italy. He succeeded his father, who had been Grand Master of the Order since 1956.

He retired from his position of Grand Master in 2008 and was succeeded by his cousin, Carlos Gereda y de Borbón, Marqués de Almazán. The Duke of Seville was then given the title of Grand Master Emeritus. In 2018, the Duke of Seville's son was elected as 50th Grand Master of the Order of Saint Lazarus (Malta-Paris obedience), succeeding Carlos Gereda y de Borbón.

Distinctions

Titles and styles
 16 November 1943 – 22 October 1968: Don Francisco de Borbón y Escasany
 22 October 1968 – present: The Most Excellent The Duke of Seville

Honours
 48th Grand Master (1996–2008) of the Order of Saint Lazarus (Malta Obedience)
 Grand Cross of the Royal Order of the Elephant of Godenu, 2017
 Knight Grand Cross of the Order of the Eagle of Georgia and the Seamless Tunic of Our Lord Jesus Christ
 Consejero Magistral (President) of the Corps of the Nobility of the Principality of Asturias

Ancestry

References

 The Royal House of Stuart, London, 1969, 1971, 1976, Addington, A. C., Reference: II 97

External links

1943 births
Living people
Nobility from Madrid
105
Grandees of Spain
Recipients of the Order of Saint Lazarus (statuted 1910)
Grand Masters of the Order of Saint Lazarus (statuted 1910)